

First round selections

The following are the first round picks in the 1975 Major League Baseball draft. Many baseball draft experts consider the 1975 draft to be the weakest in MLB history.

Other notable selections

* Did not sign

Notes

External links 
Complete draft list from The Baseball Cube database

References 

Draft
Major League Baseball draft